The FFTG Awards Film Fest is an annual international digital film festival organized by Dot & Feather Entertainment. The event spans over two weeks in end of November and includes competitive categories like 'Film of the fest', 'FFTG Spirit award', 'People Choice award', 'Female filmmaker', 'Student filmmaker', 'Screenplay writer' as the top winners of the fest. The festival gives The Grand Jury Choice Awards in various categories including feature films, documentaries, screenplay, shorts.

FFTG Awards aims to present widest choice of content from around the world by providing storytellers a platform to showcase their creativity, connect with its audience, and establish their brand. The festival draws entries from around the world.

History
FFTG stands for Film Festivals To Go, a marketing and consulting company for independent filmmakers.
Conceived and designed by filmmaker Rohit Gupta the fest was officially launched on August 16, 2020 by Dot & Feather Entertainment. FFTG Awards Film Fest is a digital event primarily intended to provide a platform of encouragement and exposure for storytellers.

Official Program
The first edition took place on November 23-December 13, 2020. Of the 400 submissions received in 72 days from 48 countries, 129 projects made it to the Official Program 2020 and 51 projects nominated. Over 100 awards were announced including the coveted, Film of the Fest, People Choice, FFTG Spirit and Screenplay awards.

We, the Chosen One's

Jury Members
We, the Chosen One's, is an invitation-only program based on the philosophy all is destined. The FFTG Awards team hand picks storytellers from preceding year submissions to invite them to join Official Selection Committee 2021.

Coffee Table Book
We, the Chosen One's, a Coffee table book include who have made the Official Program slate 2020.

Jury
The FFTG Award panel comprises filmmakers, storytellers, artists, professionals, students, technicians from diverse experiences based in various time zones from around the world. Each member of the Official Selection Committee is chosen from a wide range of personal  and professional experiences and achievements.

FFTG Awards Film Fest events

2020 FFTG Awards Film Fest
The 2020 FFTG Awards Film Fest was held digitally from November 23 to 13 December 2020. The first edition took place for three weeks which featured several activities including contests, People Choice award, FFTG Spirit award, Film of the fest award and various Jury choice awards in  multiple categories.

All films from the Official Program qualify for the Film of the Fest, People Choice award through public vote. No committee has any say in the selection. The FFTG Spirit Award represents a theme. The theme for 2020 was "story that moved me" and the winner is dependent on the majority votes from the participating filmmakers, writers that make up the Official Program.

Award Winners

2021 FFTG Awards Film Fest
The 2021 FFTG Awards Film Fest was held digitally from November 28 to December 12, 2021. The second edition took place for two weeks which featured several activities including contests, People Choice award, FFTG Spirit award, Film of the Fest award, and various Grand Jury choice awards in  multiple categories.

All films that made up the Official Selection 2021 slate qualify for the 'People Choice Film of the Fest' award through people's vote. No committee has any say in the selection. The 'FFTG Spirit' Award represents a theme. The theme for 2021 was "story that moved me" and the winner is dependent on the majority votes from the participating filmmakers, writers that make up the Official Program.

Award Winners

See also
List of film awards

References

External links
Official Website
FFTG Awards at the Internet Movie Database
Festival Overview - Watch Now

Digital film festivals
Women's film festivals
Film festivals in New York City
Recurring events established in 2020
Documentary film festivals in the United States
Animation film festivals in the United States
New media art festivals
Short film festivals in the United States
Film festivals in California
Internet film festivals